The Minister for Sport and Civil Society was a junior minister in the Department for Digital, Culture, Media and Sport of the United Kingdom government, with responsibility for sport and Civil Society in England. In 2020, the role merged with that of the Parliamentary Under-Secretary of State for Arts, Heritage and Tourism to become Parliamentary Under-Secretary of State for Sport, Tourism, Heritage and Civil Society.

The post covered sport as well as tourism and heritage. The sports minister has at various times previously reported to the Department of National Heritage, the Department of Education and Science and the Department of the Environment.

Sport is a devolved matter in Scotland, Wales and Northern Ireland resting with the corresponding ministers in the Scottish Government, Welsh Government and the Northern Ireland Executive, although when the Northern Ireland Assembly was suspended, responsibility went to the Northern Ireland Office.

Under Margaret Thatcher the office was known as Under-Secretary of State for Sport.

Current responsibilities
 Sport
 Gambling
 Horse racing
 Office for Civil Society
 The National Lottery and society lotteries
 Cross-government work on loneliness

Ministers for Sport

References

Past Ministers for Sport (PDF), Department for Culture, Media and Sport

Sport and Tourism
Sport in England
Tourism in England
Department for Digital, Culture, Media and Sport
2012 Summer Olympics
2012 Summer Paralympics
England